The Director, Public Transport Safety (the Safety Director) was the independent Government agency responsible for rail and bus safety in the State of Victoria, Australia, between 1 August 2006 and 30 June 2010.  The position was created as a statutory office by statute in early 2006 and was the State's first independent public transport safety position.  The office was superseded by the position of the Director, Transport Safety which commenced operation on 1 July 2010.  The former Safety Director, Public Transport Safety, Alan Osborne, was directly appointed to the new office.

The office of the Director, Public Transport Safety commenced operation on 1 August 2006, initially within the Department of Infrastructure.  It later formed part of the Department of Transport until the office was abolished in mid July 2010.  The Safety Director was one of three dedicated transport safety offices in Victoria during this period, the others being the Director of Marine Safety and the Chief Investigator, Public Transport and Marine Safety Investigations.

The Director, Public Transport Safety was responsible for regulation and compliance activities in the public transport sector with oversight of the rail and bus sectors.  The Director of Marine Safety, on the other hand, had oversight of the safety performance of the commercial shipping and recreational boating sectors.  The Chief Investigator had responsibility for no blame or just culture investigations and inquiries in those areas.  The Director, Public Transport Safety traded under the name Public Transport Safety Victoria until the office was abolished in mid-2010.

Establishment

Review 
The proposal for a new public transport regulator in Victoria was developed separately but concurrently with the development of the rail safety regulatory scheme reflected in Victoria's Rail Safety Act 2006.  The Department of Infrastructure commissioned a review in 2004 which led to a detailed report on the subject - the Review of the Role and Accountability Arrangements for Public Transport and Marine Safety Regulation in Victoria. The review examined governance arrangements for safety regulation in the public transport sector drawing on Australian and overseas models.  Recommendations were made aimed by the review at improving the governance, accountability and methodology of the then public transport regulator which had til then obtained its powers to regulate safety through delegation from the Secretary of the then Department of Infrastructure. Particular concerns were expressed about the lack of independence of the regulator function and the perceived lack of clarity about its charter and accountabilities. Ultimately, the review recommended the creation of a new independent statutory office with a clearer charter and accountability arrangements.

The governance review also examined the case for merging the public transport regulator with the then Victorian marine safety regulator, the Director of Marine Safety. While not recommended at that time, the review found that integration of the functions could be examined in two to three years time once the public transport regulatory schemes had been settled and further examination of marine safety regulation had occurred.  The Victorian Government ultimately pursued the full integration of its public transport and marine safety regulators some five years later as part of its Transport Integration Act proposal.

Ultimately, the proposals for both a new rail transport safety regulation scheme and new public transport safety governance arrangements were presented to the Victorian Parliament as proposed legislation, a Rail Safety Bill, in early October 2005.

Statute 
The Rail Safety Bill was passed by the lower house, the Legislative Assembly, on 1 March 2006.  The Bill was introduced into the upper house, the Legislative Council, on 2 March 2006. Second reading was moved in the upper house on 28 March and the Bill was ultimately passed without further amendment on 29 March 2006.

The provisions establishing the office of the Director, Public Transport Safety were set out in Part 10 of the Rail Safety Bill.  These provisions added a new subdivision 3 into Part II of the then Transport Act 1983 to establish the Safety Director's office and to create its objects, functions and powers.

Commencement 
The Rail Safety Bill received the Royal Assent on 4 April 2006 to become the Rail Safety Act 2006. The Act was ultimately proclaimed to commence on 1 August 2006.  The Rail Safety Regulations 2006 which were required to support the operation of the Act also operated from the same date thereby formally commencing the scheme.  Commencement of the Act formally established the office of the Director, Public Transport Safety.

Abolition 
The office of the Director, Public Transport Safety was later abolished following the passage and commencement of the Transport Integration Act 2010 on 1 July of that year.   The Transport Integration Act effectively amalgamated the offices of the Director, Public Transport Safety and the Director of Marine Safety and the Director of Marine Safety. This step resulted in the creation of Victoria's first integrated transport safety administration with multi modal responsibilities in both land and water-based transport.

The speech delivered by the Minister in the Victorian Parliament moving the second reading of the then Transport Integration Bill put the matter as follows -

"The 2004 TFG International Review of the Role and Accountability Arrangements for Public Transport and Marine Safety in Victoria provided the framework -- implemented by the Rail Safety Act 2006 -- to establish the independent Director, Public Transport Safety, and the Chief Investigator, Transport and Marine Safety Investigations.  However, the Director of Marine Safety has not yet been given this same independence.  The Bill addresses this by merging the Director of Marine Safety and the Director, Public Transport Safety.  This is a significant change, creating a single independent transport safety regulator.  It will provide a more integrated approach to safety regulation, while it is also likely to drive efficiencies by removing unnecessary duplication in systems and processes. "

The commencement of the Transport Integration Act therefore formally abolished the office of the Director, Public Transport Safety at midnight on 30 June 2010.  The replacement position, the Director, Transport Safety, commenced immediately from that point on 1 July 2010.

See also 
 Rail Transport in Victoria
 Railways in Melbourne
 Trams in Melbourne
 Buses in Melbourne
 Director, Transport Safety
 Chief Investigator, Transport Safety
 Rail Safety Act
 Transport Integration Act
 Safety

References

External links 
 Transport Safety, Victoria

Public transport in Melbourne
Bus transport in Victoria (Australia)
Former government agencies of Victoria (Australia)
Transport safety organizations
2006 establishments in Australia
2010 disestablishments in Australia
Government agencies established in 2006